Clan Logan is a Scottish clan. Two distinct branches of Clan Logan exist: the Highland branch; and the Lowland branch (which descends from Sir Robert Logan of Restalrig who married Katherine Stewart, a daughter of the future Robert II and, in 1400, became Lord High Admiral of Scotland). The clan does not have a chief recognised by Lord Lyon King of Arms, and therefore can be considered an armigerous clan.
Today, some regard Clan MacLennan as a variant of the Highland Logan clan.

History

The surname Logan is a territorial name, likely derived from the lands of Logan in present Ayrshire, Scotland. The earliest record of the surname is of Robert Logan who is recorded as witnessing the resignation of the lands of Ingilbristoun in 1204. The name is variously recorded throughout the 13th century. Several Logans are recorded as paying homage to Edward I of England within the Ragman Rolls of 1296. These are Phelippe de Logyn (burgess from Montrose), Thurbrandus de Logyn (from Dumfrieshire), Andreu de Logan (from Wigtonshire), and Wautier Logan (from Lanarkshire). The seal of Wautier Logan (SIGILLVM WALTERI LOGAN) is blazoned a stag's head cabossed, between the antlers, a shield with three piles.

Walter Logan, lord of Hartside was a sheriff of Lanark in 1301, and in 1298 had received a grant of the lands of "Lus" from Robert Bruce. This Walter Logan appears twice on a roll of landowners forfeited in 1306 by Edward I, for supporting Robert the Bruce. The first instance of Logan has John Cromwell as the petitioner for Logan's forfeited lands, while the second instance of Walter Logan has William Mulcaster and John Bisset petitioning for his lands.

In 1306 Dominus Walter Logan was taken prisoner by the English forces and hanged at Durham, in the presence of Edward of Carnarvon (the future Edward II of England).

In 1330 brothers Sir Robert Logan of Restalrig and Sir Walter Logan; along with Sir William de Keith, Sir William de St. Clair of Rosslyn; accompanied Sir James Douglas in his quest to take the heart of the dead King Robert I of Scotland to the Holy Land. Douglas and his company had been received by Alfonso XI of Castile, who campaigning against the Moors, in the Kingdom of Granada. Near the Castillo de la Estrella, Alfonso's army fought the Saracens at the Battle of Teba. During the battle Douglas observed a knight of his company surrounded by Moorish warriors, and with his remaining men attempted to relieve his countryman. As the knights were hard pressed and outnumbered by the Moors, Sir James Douglas took the silver casket containing the heart of Robert Bruce, and threw it before him among the enemy, saying, "Now pass thou onward before us, as thou wert wont, and I will follow thee or die." Sir James Douglas and most of his men were slain, among them Sir Robert Logan and Sir Walter Logan.

The leading Logan family's principal seat was in Lastalrig or Restalrig, near Edinburgh. Sir Robert Logan of Restalrig married Katherine Stewart, daughter of Robert II of Scotland, and later in 1400 Sir Robert was appointed Admiral of Scotland.

Sir Robert Logan was one of the hostages given in 1424 to free James I of Scotland from being held in England. Robert's son or grandson, John Logan of Restalrig, was made principal sheriff of Edinburgh by James II of Scotland.

In 1555 Logan of Restalrig sold the superiority of Leith (the principal seaport of Edinburgh) to the queen regent Mary of Lorraine, also known as Marie de Guise.

The last Logan to possess the barony was Robert Logan of Restalrig, who was described by contemporaries as "ane godless, drunkin, and deboshit man". Sir Walter Scott described him as "one of the darkest characters of that dark age".

The last Logan of Logan, in Ayrshire was celebrated for both his wit and eccentricity. Logan was known for his The Laird of Logan, published after his death, which was a compilation of amusing anecdotes and puns. He had one daughter, who married a Mr. Campbell.

Relationship with Clan MacLennan

Shared tartans
 
Today both clans Logan and MacLennan share the same tartan. This tartan was first recorded in 1831 by the historian James Logan, in his book The Scottish Gaël. Later in 1845 The Clans of the Scottish Highlands was published, which consisted of text from Logan, accompanied by illustrations from R. R. McIan. This work was the first which showed the MacLennan's sharing the same tartan as the Logans. The text on the history of Clan Logan pointed to an ancient link between the Logans and MacLennans. The plate for MacLennan, shows a man from this clan wearing the Logan tartan, but no name is given to it unlike every other clan tartan shown. Given the style of writing at the time and subtleties used by both the artist and writer, this is not a surprise and allows them to pay homage to the story of the origin of MacLennan. Until the early nineteenth century there was no such thing as "clan tartans".

The founder of the MacLennans was at best the great grandson of Gilliegorm Logan (a mythical Chief of Clan Logan from circa 1372), and was far removed from the holdings of the Clan Logan. The MacLennan were subservient to clans Fraser and MacKenzie at various times.

Chiefly Arms
The issue of Chiefly Arms has come up as a point of contention, with the heart of the Bruce being incorporated into the Arms of the MacLennan Chief, being given as proof of relationship. This could however not be further from the truth. The current Chief of MacLennan may have a heart in his Arms, but the recorded Arms of the Chiefly line of MacLennan were of a shield argent, three piles (long points), sable, in chief, and in base, a cross crosslet fitchee, gules. The Crest was an arm and broadsword, proper, with the Motto (same as current) Dum Spiro Spero "While I breathe, I hope". The Arms and Crest of the old line of MacLennan Chiefs show no regard to Logan heritage at all.

The Clan MacLennan has also apparently added to this controversy by stating that the first known of that name was Duncan MacLennan of Strathearn. Duncan is mentioned in a charter of King Alexander II in 1217 as being the Laird of Bombie, and it is through him that the MacLellans are said to have originated (by the MacLennans only). This is over one hundred years before the birth of the child of Gilligorm Logan.

This history is further complicated by the mention of Lide MacLennan and his twelve hundred men in the authenticity debated Ossianic poetry, which is purported to be sixth century. St. Adomnán of Iona is also said to have recorded that they occupied Glenshiel at this time.

Other sources on MacLennan, cite that the clan was at Eilean Donan castle before 1263 and that the MacGillafinnens, or MacLennans, were titled Lords of Loch Erne, Tairg, and Muintir Peodachain.

With all of the evidence to suggest that MacLennan are an old and proud clan, and in existence as long or longer than that of Logan, the descendantcy of the current line of MacLennan Chiefs includes none of this. They cite their origin to Gille Fhinnein, grandson of Gilligorm Logan, and show no connection to any MacLennan before this time.

Clan symbols

Today Scottish clans use crest badges, clan badges (plant badges) and tartan as symbols to represent themselves. The crest badge suitable for members of Clan Logan contains the heraldic crest of a passion nail piercing a human heart, Proper; and the heraldic motto HOC MAJORUM VIRTUS, which translates from Latin as "this is valour of my ancestors". The plant badge (clan badge) associated with Clan Logan is furze (gorse). According to Robert Bain, the slogan of Clan Logan is Druim-nan-deur (translation from Scottish Gaelic: "the ridge of tears").

The tartan most commonly associated with the surname Logan is identical to that of Clan MacLennan. The sett was first published by James Logan's The Scottish Gaël of 1831. There are however earlier dated tartans which are attributed to the name Logan. One such tartan is usually known as a Skene tartan, though it has sometimes been known as a Rose tartan. The official state tartan of Utah is based upon this tartan, in respect of Ephraim Logan who is considered the first American of Scottish descent who left a permanent mark on Utah.

Clan Logan in Fiction
In the drama Law & Order, Detective Mike Logan learns that in his family ancestorial home in Ireland there are only two persons with the Logan surname-one is the Parish priest; the second is his brother who owns a pub and a funeral parlor.

Notes

References

R.R. McIan, "The Clans of The Scottish Highlands"
International Clan Logan Society, Inc.
Our Valour©, newsletter of the International Clan Logan Society, Inc.
works cited
Anderson, William. The Scottish Nation; Or The Surnames, Families, Literature, Honours, And Biographical History Of The People Of Scotland. (vol.2). Edinburgh: A. Fullarton & Co., 1862.
Bain, Robert. The Clans And Tartans Of Scotland. London and Glasgow: Fontana and Collins, 1983. 
Barrow, G W S. Robert Bruce, and the Community of the Realm of Scotland. London: Eyre & Spottiswoode, 1965.
Black, George Fraser. (1946). The Surnames of Scotland : Their Origin, Meaning and History. (New York).
Stewart, Donald C. The Setts of the Scottish Tartans, with descriptive and historical notes. London: Shepheard-Walwyn, 1974. 
Thompson, Thomas. (1834). Publica Sive Processus Super Fidelitatibus Et Homagiis Scotorum Domino Regi Angliæ Factis A.D. MCCXCI-MCCXCVI. (Bannatyne Club).

External links
http://www.electricscotland.com/webclans/htol/logan.html
http://www.clanlogansociety.com/
http://www.clanlogan.ca/

Scottish clans
Armigerous clans